The Hollins Baronetcy, of Greyfriars in the parish of Broughton in the Northern Division of the County Palatine of Lancaster, was a title in the Baronetage of the United Kingdom. It was created on 29 November 1907 for Frank Hollins, head of Horrockses, Crewdson and Co, cotton spinners and manufacturers. The title became extinct on the death of the third Baronet in 1963.

Hollins baronets, of Greyfriars (1907)
Sir Frank Hollins, 1st Baronet (1843–1924)
Sir Arthur Meyrick Hollins, 2nd Baronet (1876–1938)
Sir Frank Hubert Hollins, 3rd Baronet (1877–1963)

References

Extinct baronetcies in the Baronetage of the United Kingdom